Magdalena Powanskca Swat (born 1991) is a Polish beauty pageant titleholder who was crowned as 1st runner up of Miss Polonia 2017 and appointed to be Miss Universe Poland 2018 and represented Poland at the Miss Universe 2018 in Bangkok, Thailand where she ended as  Top 20 semifinalist.

Personal life
Magdalena Swat is from the town of Ostrowiec Świętokrzyski. She graduated from Warsaw University of Technology with a Masters of Science in Administration. She works as a model and influencer, but her true passion is Psychology.

In 2010, she was a wildcard contestant of Top Model. Zostań modelką (season 1). She was also a model on an episode of Project Runway.

Pageantry

Miss Polonia 2017
Magdalena Swat finished as the 1st Runner-up at the Miss Polonia 2017. Meanwhile, the official winner was Agata Biernat crowned as the 2017 winner and competed at Miss World 2018 in Sanya, China. Swat was appointed as Miss Universe Poland 2018. She succeeded outgoing Miss Polonia 2017 1st Runner-up and Miss Universe Poland 2017 Katarzyna Włodarek.

Miss Universe 2018
Swat represented Poland at Miss Universe 2018 pageant in Bangkok, Thailand where she finished among the top 20. She wore a dress from the Kielce house of couture.

References

External links
Official Miss Polonia website

1991 births
Living people
Miss Universe 2018 contestants
Polish beauty pageant winners
Top Model contestants